The Central District of Aqqala County is a district (bakhsh) in Aqqala County, Golestan Province, Iran. At the 2006 census, its population was 84,291, in 17,538 families.  The District has one city: Aqqala.  The District has three rural districts (dehestan): Aq Altin Rural District, Gorganbuy Rural District, and Sheykh Musa Rural District.

References 

Districts of Golestan Province
Aqqala County